This is a list of British television related events from 1944.

Events

There are no events for 1944 in British television as broadcasting had been suspended for the duration of the Second World War, this was done amid fears the signals would help German bombers. Broadcasting resumed in 1946.

Births
 28 January – Bobby Ball (Harper), half of comedy double act Cannon and Ball (died 2020)
 2 February – Geoffrey Hughes, English actor (died 2012)
 8 February – Roger Lloyd-Pack, English actor (died 2014)
 13 February – Jerry Springer, English-born television host
 17 February – Nick Hewer, public relations consultant and television personality
 11 March – Don Maclean, British comedian
 8 April – Hywel Bennett, Welsh actor (died 2017)
 27 April – Michael Fish, British television weatherman
 29 April – Michael Angelis, actor and narrator (died 2020)
 5 May – John Rhys-Davies, Welsh actor
 7 May – Richard O'Sullivan, actor
 12 May – Sara Kestelman, British actor
 31 May – Samantha Juste, Top of the Pops hostess (died 2014)
 1 June – Robert Powell, actor
 11 June – Vince Earl, singer, comedian and actor
 27 July – Tony Capstick, English comedian, actor and musician (died 2003)
 31 July – Jonathan Dimbleby, broadcaster and television presenter
 9 August – John Simpson, BBC foreign correspondent and world affairs editor
 11 August – Ian McDiarmid, Scottish actor
 13 September 
 Carol Barnes, journalist (died 2008)
 Jacqueline Bisset, English actress
 22 September – Frazer Hines, British actor
 26 September – Anne Robinson, British television host
 12 October – Angela Rippon, journalist and newsreader
 20 October – Clive Hornby, actor (died 2008)
 28 October – Ian Marter, British actor (died 1986)
 17 December – Bernard Hill, English actor
 24 December – Barry Chuckle (Elliott), half of children's entertainment comedy double act the Chuckle Brothers (died 2018)
 25 December – Kenny Everett, English radio DJ and comedian (died 1995)

See also
 1944 in British music
 1944 in the United Kingdom
 List of British films of 1944

References